Mühleholz is a village in Liechtenstein located in the municipality of Vaduz.

Geography
The village lies south of Schaan and north of Vaduz, a few kilometres away from the Swiss border. It is crossed by the Schaanstrasse.

References

Villages of Liechtenstein
Schaan
Liechtenstein–Switzerland border crossings